Travelers Rest or Traveller's Rest may refer to:

In the United States
Traveler's Rest (Shelby City, Kentucky), a historic property in Lincoln County, Kentucky, associated with Isaac Shelby
Travelers Rest (Toccoa, Georgia), a historic building listed on the NRHP in Stephens County, Georgia
Travellers Rest, Macon County, Georgia, an unincorporated community
Travellers Rest, Kentucky, an unincorporated community
Traveller's Rest (Natchez, Mississippi)
Traveler's Rest (Lolo, Montana), a historic site listed on the NRHP in Montana, associated with the Lewis and Clark Expedition
Travelers Rest, South Carolina, a city
Travellers Rest (Nashville, Tennessee), historic house listed on the NRHP in Tennessee, associated with John Overton
Travelers Rest (Burlington, West Virginia), historic stage stop on the Northwestern Turnpike
Traveller's Rest (Kearneysville, West Virginia), Horatio Gates' home, now a National Historic Landmark

In Australia
Travellers Rest, Tasmania, a peri-urban settlement near Launceston
Travellers Rest Inn, a heritage-listed former inn and residences and now offices at 12, 14 and 16 O'Connell Street, Parramatta, NSW

In the United Kingdom
Travellers Rest, Alpraham, a pub in Cheshire

See also
Travellers' Rest Inn
Traveller’s Repose
Travelers Hotel